John Watson is a New Zealand politician who is a councillor on the Auckland Council.

Education and early years
Watson has lived in Hibiscus Coast and East Coast Bays his entire life. He attended Westlake Boys High School, where he served as head boy, captain of 1st XI cricket, and a member of 1st XV rugby and athletics. He graduated from the University of Auckland with an M.A. (Hons) in history and worked as a secondary school teacher.

Political and community involvement

Watson has served as the President of the WRRA, the Trustee of Whangaparaoa Community Trust, a Rodney District Councillor and as a Hibiscus & Bays local board member.

A Rodney District councillor, Watson stood at the 2010 Auckland Council elections alongside Wayne Walker, finishing fourth.

He stood again in the 2013 Auckland Council elections and was this time elected as an Albany ward councillor. He was also re-elected to the Hibiscus and Bays Local Board, standing for "People & Penlink First". Penlink is a proposed road that will improve transport links to the Whangaparaoa Peninsula.

In his first term as an Auckland Councillor, Watson worked to reduce Auckland Council's spending and restrict rates increases by restricting the business-class air travel of councillors to health grounds only and voting against the controversial 10 year budget on 25 June 2015, which included a transport levy and 9.95% rates increase. He has also worked to improve transportation, improve and increase sports facilities and reserves, protect Auckland's heritage and environment and increase communication with Auckland residents. While Watson works together with Walker, they often differ in their positions, as when they voted differently on passing the 10 year budget.

Watson and Walker were both re-elected during the 2016 Auckland elections.
They were both re-elected again in 2019, and provisionally in 2022.

Awards
Watson has been awarded two Royal Society of NZ Teachers Fellowships, for producing a written account of a bomber crew who perished during World War II, and a written and oral history of Whangaparaoa.

References

Living people
Auckland Councillors
Rodney District Councillors
New Zealand schoolteachers
People educated at Westlake Boys High School
University of Auckland alumni
Year of birth missing (living people)